Hoon Balakram (1876–1929) was an Indian mathematician, civil servant and Bombay High Court judge.

Biography
Balakram was born in Jalandhar, Punjab in 1876. He received his master's degree from Panjab University and later passed the Mathematical Tripos from the St John's College, Cambridge.

In 1899 he passed the Indian Civil Service examination. Among other posts in his career he was appointed a Bombay High Court judge in 1929 a month before his death. He also served as the president of Indian Mathematical Society from 1921 to 26.

Mathematical achievements

References

1876 births
1929 deaths
19th-century Indian mathematicians
Indian civil servants
Judges of the Bombay High Court
Indian number theorists
Panjab University alumni
Alumni of St John's College, Cambridge
Presidents of the Indian Mathematical Society
20th-century Indian mathematicians
People from Jalandhar
Scientists from Punjab, India
Judges in British India
Mathematicians in British India